Ulfe is a river of Hesse, Germany. It flows into the Sontra in Wichmannshausen.

See also
List of rivers of Hesse

References

Rivers of Hesse
East Hesse
Rivers of Germany